The Masked Singer Malaysia is a Malaysian mystery and reality music show based on the Masked Singer franchise which originated from the South Korean television program King of Mask Singer. The program aired its first season in September 2020, on Astro Warna and hosted by AC Mizal. The first season has been aired on Astro Warna (CH127) and Warna HD (CH107) at 21:00 (MTC) every Friday with a total of eight episodes from 18 September until 6 November 2020. The second season started airing from 28 January 2022. A season 3 premiered in Dec 23, 2022.

Host and panelist
The host and panelist for The Masked Singer Malaysia were revealed on the official press conference on 8 September 2020. The host for The Masked Singer Malaysia is the nation's well known entertainer, Dato' AC Mizal. The panelist consisting of nine popular local celebrities who played role as permanent jury. Prior to the airing of its first episode, ten posters of the host and panelist with hidden faces were published by ASTRO as a teaser for the program.

Concept
Twelve contestants who are well-known figures from various backgrounds, such as singers, actors, hosts, athletes and more, will be vying for the top spot by charming the audience and jury with just their voices. They will be judged by a panel of jury made up of popular local celebrities. To further keep the contestants' identities top secret, only eight members of the production team have been entrusted with their true identities. Every week, before each performance, a video clip will be revealed to the audience as a clue for the identity of each contestant. After each performance, the jury members are required to make a guess and name 3 celebrities who are most likely to be the identity behind the masked singer. In the end of the show, one contestant with the lowest rank will be eliminated based on the marks percentage given by the panelist. His or her face will then be revealed for the first time. The only contestant to remain masked until the final elimination round will be named the first champion of "The Masked Singer Malaysia". The show, which is taped weekly with a live audience at Royal Theatre, Shah Alam, is held on a smaller scale than usual. The number of audience members is limited in compliance with current social distancing procedures.

Costume design
All contestants are wearing costumes that cover them from head to toe, completely obscuring their identities. The costume design was revealed on the official press conference on 8 September 2020. The costume design for the first season is created and prepared by Akma Suriati Awang. They are inspired and based on Malaysian culture including ABC (Malaysian shaved ice dessert), Ayam Jantan (rooster or adult male chicken), Bunga Raya (Malaysia's national flower), Rajah Brooke (butterfly from rainforest), Enggang (hornbills mostly found in Sarawak), Musang King (popular variety of Durian, king of fruits), Nasi Lemak (Malaysia's national food), Orang Utan (native mammal from Borneo and Sumatra), Rafflesia (biggest flower in Malaysia), Reno (rhinoceros which can be found in Southern Asia), Rimau (Malayan tiger), and Wau (traditional moon-kite game from Kelantan). For second season, Akma Suriati collaborated with Hatta Dolmat for the costume design. The 14 characters are Bujang Senang, Nanas, Mat Penyu, Seladang, Teh Tarik Kaw, Harum Manis, Periuk Kera, Aiskrim Roti, Rambutan, Ratu Semut, Orkid, Si Merak, Burung Hantu and Pepatung.

Season Overview

Reception

Awards and nominations

Notes
The show is available for streaming on Astro GO.
SK Magic and Oppo are the main sponsors for season 1.
Cuckoo is the main sponsor for season 2.

See also
The Masked Singer Malaysia (season 1)
The Masked Singer Malaysia (season 2)
Masked Singer
Astro Warna
Akademi Fantasia
I Can See Your Voice Malaysia

References

External links
Astro's Official Website
Gempak's Official Website
ASTRO GO

Masked Singer Malaysia, The
Musical game shows
Malaysian reality television series
Malaysian television series based on South Korean television series
2020s Malaysian television series